Corinne Nugter (born 28 March 1992, in Emmeloord) is a Dutch athlete specialising in the discus throw. She won two medals at the 2009 European Youth Summer Olympic Festival.

Her personal best in the event is 60.02 metres set in Heerhugowaard in 2018.

International competitions

References

1992 births
Living people
Dutch female discus throwers
People from Emmeloord
Dutch Athletics Championships winners
Sportspeople from Noordoostpolder
21st-century Dutch women